Events in the year 2009 in Kerala.

Incumbents 

Governor of Kerala - R. S. Gavai

Chief minister of Kerala - V. S. Achuthanandan

Events 

 January 8 - Manmohan Singh inaugurates Indian Naval Academy at Ezhimala, Kannur.
 April 16 - 2009 Indian general election in Kerala held in Kerala as Phase 1 of 2009 Indian general election.
 May 17 - 2009 Beemapally police shooting
 August 21 - Paul M George of The Muthoot Group murdered by assailants following a road rage incident.
 September 23 - A gang of DHRM (Dalit Human Rights Movement) workers killed a senior citizen named Sivaprasad, who went for morning walk near Ayiroor, Thiruvananthapuram. 
 September 30 - Nearly 45 tourists killed in 2009 Thekkady boat disaster by drowning in the reservoir.
 November 10 - United Democratic Front wins By-election held to three assembly seats namely Kannur, Alappuzha and Ernakulam.

Deaths 

 February 1 - Syed Muhammedali Shihab Thangal, 73, religious leader and politician.
 August 6 - Murali (Malayalam actor), 55.

See also 

 History of Kerala
 2009 in India

References 

2000s in Kerala